Montreux '77 – Live is a live album by American jazz guitarist Joe Pass that was recorded in 1977 at the Montreux Jazz Festival.

Reception

In his Allmusic review, critic Scott Yanow wrote "All of Joe Pass' Pablo dates (this one has been reissued on CD via the OJC imprint) are well worth acquiring, but since there are so many others, this one falls just short of being essential."

Track listing
"Blues for Yano San" (Joe Pass) – 6:10
"Blues for Sitges" (Pass) – 8:55
"Blues for Val" (Pass) – 6:05
"Wait till You See Her" (Richard Rodgers, Lorenz Hart) – 5:23
"She's Funny That Way" (Neil Moret, Richard A. Whiting) – 5:03
"Blues for Martin" (Pass) – 4:20
"This Masquerade" (Leon Russell) – 5:56

Personnel
 Joe Pass – guitar

References

Joe Pass live albums
Albums produced by Norman Granz
Albums recorded at the Montreux Jazz Festival
1977 live albums
Pablo Records live albums